Warley Leandro da Silva (born 17 September 1999), simply known as Warley, is a Brazilian footballer who plays as a right back and winger for Ceará, on loan from Coritiba.

Career statistics

Club

Honours
Botafogo
 Campeonato Brasileiro Série B: 2021
Campeão Paranaense 2022

References

1999 births
Living people
Brazilian footballers
Sportspeople from Recife
Association football defenders
Campeonato Brasileiro Série A players
Campeonato Brasileiro Série B players
Campeonato Brasileiro Série C players
Santa Cruz Futebol Clube players
Centro Sportivo Alagoano players
Botafogo de Futebol e Regatas players
Coritiba Foot Ball Club players
Ceará Sporting Club players